Yellow Quill First Nation(formerly Nut Lake Band of Saulteaux) is a Saulteaux First Nation band government in Saskatchewan, Canada. Their reserve is twenty kilometres northwest of Kelvington.  The Yellow Quill First Nation is a signatory of Treaty No. 4, which was signed by Chief Yellow-quill on August 24, 1876.

Total registered population in October 2007, was 2522, of which the on-reserve population was 800+ members, and off-reserve population was 1600+ members.  The First Nation is a member of the Saskatoon Tribal Council and have their urban offices in Saskatoon as well as their Tribal Council offices.

History 
The First Nation was originally part of the Yellow-quill Saulteaux Band, a Treaty Band named after a Treaty 4 signatory Chief Ošāwaškokwanēpi, whose name means "Green/Blue-quill."  However, due to "š" merging with "s" in Nakawēmowin (Saulteaux language), this led to a mistranslation of his name as "Yellow-quill"—"yellow" being osāw-, while "green/blue" being ošāwaško- (or osāwasko- in Saulteaux).  Soon after the death of Chief Ošāwaškokwanēpi, the Band divided into three groups, of which the central division about Nut Lake became the Nut Lake Band of Saulteaux, located on the Nut Lake Indian Reserve.  In 1989, the Band changed their name to "Yellowquill"—one word—in honour the founding chief; however, when their post office opened in 1993, it was named as "Yellow Quill"—two words.

Reserves
The First Nation have reserved for themselves four reserves:
  Yellowquill Indian Reserve 90 (formerly Nut Lake Indian Reserve 90), which serves as their main Reserve, containing the community of Yellow Quill.
  Yellow Quill Indian Reserve 90-8
  Yellow Quill Indian Reserve 90-18
  Treaty Four Reserve Grounds 77, which is shared with 32 other First Nations.

Governance 
Yellow Quill have an elected tribal council consisting of a chief and seven councillors.  The current council for the three-year-long electoral term ending on November 26, 2020 consists of Chief John Machiskinic and Councilors Joseph Crowe, Bernard Kishayinew,  Agnes Whitehead, Myron Neapetung, Tyrone Peeace, Dean Severight, and Pauline Whitehead.

Services 
Yellow Quill operates Yellow Quill Health Centre, Nawigizigweyas School (K-12), Yellow Quill Daycare, Robert Neapetung Memorial Water Treatment Plant, Yellow Quill Store, and the Band Office, all of which are on reserve.

References

External links

Anishinaabe reserves in Canada